Todd Kinchen (born January 7, 1969) is a former professional American football player who played wide receiver for seven seasons in the National Football League (NFL) for the Los Angeles / St. Louis Rams, the Denver Broncos, and the Atlanta Falcons. He currently holds an NFL record with two punt return touchdowns in a single game, which he shares with 13 other players. His father is Gaynell "Gus" Kinchen, a member of the 1958 LSU Tigers football team and one of the famed Chinese Bandits. His brother Brian also played in the NFL.

References

1969 births
Living people
Players of American football from Baton Rouge, Louisiana
American football wide receivers
American football return specialists
LSU Tigers football players
Los Angeles Rams players
St. Louis Rams players
Denver Broncos players
Atlanta Falcons players